Millers Fork is a stream in the U.S. state of Ohio.

Millers Fork bears the name of an early settler.

See also
List of rivers of Ohio

References

Rivers of Darke County, Ohio
Rivers of Preble County, Ohio
Rivers of Ohio